William Talbot Agar (15 February 1814 – 12 June 1906) was an English cricketer with amateur status. He was born at Camden Town, London and played for Cambridge University and Marylebone Cricket Club (MCC) and made his first-class debut in 1835. He was educated at Harrow School and Trinity College, Cambridge.

References

1814 births
1906 deaths
English cricketers
English cricketers of 1826 to 1863
Cambridge University cricketers
Marylebone Cricket Club cricketers
People from Camden Town
Cricketers from Greater London
People educated at Harrow School
Alumni of Trinity College, Cambridge